Eriocottis andalusiella is a moth in the Eriocottidae family. It was described by Rebel in 1901. It is found in Portugal and Spain.

The wingspan is 17–19 mm. The forewings are brownish, sprinkled with dark scales. The hindwings are dark greyish.

References

Moths described in 1901
Eriocottidae
Moths of Europe